Almighty DP 2 is a collaborative mixtape by hip hop recording artist Chief Keef and producer DP Beats. It is the sequel to the project Almighty DP, released by the duo earlier in 2015. It was self-released on September 11, 2015. It is available on the mixtape website DatPiff.

Track listing
All tracks produced by DP Beats.

References

2015 mixtape albums
Chief Keef albums
Self-released albums
Sequel albums